Hildegardia gillettii is a species of flowering plant in the family Malvaceae. It is found only in Somalia, and is threatened by habitat loss.

References

Sterculioideae
Endangered plants
Endemic flora of Somalia
Taxonomy articles created by Polbot